Tolosa–Hunt syndrome is a rare disorder characterized by severe and unilateral headaches with orbital pain, along with weakness and paralysis (ophthalmoplegia) of certain eye muscles (extraocular palsies).

In 2004, the International Headache Society provided a definition of the diagnostic criteria which included granuloma.

Signs and symptoms
Symptoms are usually limited to one side of the head, and in most cases the individual affected will experience intense, sharp pain and paralysis of muscles around the eye. Symptoms may subside without medical intervention, yet recur without a noticeable pattern.

In addition, affected individuals may experience paralysis of various facial nerves and drooping of the upper eyelid (ptosis). Other signs include double vision, fever, chronic fatigue, vertigo or arthralgia. Occasionally the patient may present with a feeling of protrusion of one or both eyeballs (exophthalmos).

Causes
The cause of Tolosa–Hunt syndrome is not known, but the disorder is thought to be, and often assumed to be, associated with inflammation of the areas behind the eyes (cavernous sinus and superior orbital fissure).

Diagnosis
Tolosa–Hunt syndrome is usually diagnosed via exclusion, and as such a vast amount of laboratory tests are required to rule out other causes of the patient's symptoms. These tests include a complete blood count, thyroid function tests and serum protein electrophoresis. Studies of cerebrospinal fluid may also be beneficial in distinguishing between Tolosa–Hunt syndrome and conditions with similar signs and symptoms.

MRI scans of the brain and orbit with and without contrast, magnetic resonance angiography or digital subtraction angiography and a CT scan of the brain and orbit with and without contrast may all be useful in detecting inflammatory changes in the cavernous sinus, superior orbital fissure and/or orbital apex. Inflammatory change of the orbit on cross sectional imaging in the absence of cranial nerve palsy is described by the more benign and general nomenclature of orbital pseudotumor.Sometimes a biopsy may need to be obtained to confirm the diagnosis, as it is useful in ruling out a neoplasm. Other diagnoses to consider include craniopharyngioma, migraine and meningioma.

Treatment
Treatment of Tolosa–Hunt syndrome includes immunosuppressives such as corticosteroids (often prednisolone) or steroid-sparing agents (such as methotrexate or azathioprine).

Radiotherapy has also been proposed.

Prognosis
The prognosis of Tolosa–Hunt syndrome is usually considered good. Patients usually respond to corticosteroids, and spontaneous remission can occur, although movement of ocular muscles may remain damaged. Roughly 30–40% of patients who are treated for Tolosa–Hunt syndrome experience a relapse.

Epidemiology
Tolosa–Hunt syndrome is uncommon internationally. There is one recorded case in New South Wales, Australia. Both sexes, male and female, are affected equally, and it typically occurs around the age of 60.

References

External links 

Neurological disorders
Syndromes affecting the eye
Abducens nerve
Rare diseases